Mesa del Caballo is a census-designated place (CDP) in Gila County, Arizona, United States. The population was 765 at the 2010 census.

Geography
The CDP is located in northern Gila County atop Houston Mesa, a low ridge north of Payson.

Transportation

The Payson Senior Center operates the Beeline Bus, which provides local bus service between Payson and Mesa del Caballo.

Demographics

References

Census-designated places in Gila County, Arizona